The 1933 NC State Wolfpack football team was an American football team that represented North Carolina State University as a member of the Southern Conference (SoCon) during the 1933 college football season. In its third and final season under head coach John "Clipper" Smith, the team compiled a 1–5–3 record (0–4 against SoCon opponents), finished in last place in the conference, and was outscored by a total of 62 to 23.

Schedule

References

NC State
NC State Wolfpack football seasons
NC State Wolfpack football